is a railway station in the town of Wakasa, Mikatakaminaka District, Fukui Prefecture, Japan, operated by West Japan Railway Company (JR West).

Lines

Station layout
The station consists of one side platform serving a single bi-directional track. The station is staffed.

Adjacent stations

History
Ōtoba Station opened on 10 November 1918.  With the privatization of Japanese National Railways (JNR) on 1 April 1987, the station came under the control of JR West.

Passenger statistics
In fiscal 2016, the station was used by an average of 117 passengers daily (boarding passengers only).

Surrounding area
 Ōtoba Post Office
 Ōtoba Elementary School

See also
 List of railway stations in Japan

References

External links

  

Railway stations in Fukui Prefecture
Stations of West Japan Railway Company
Railway stations in Japan opened in 1918
Obama Line
Wakasa, Fukui